The Ptolemaic dynasty (Ptolemaioi), sometimes referred to as the Lagid dynasty (Λαγίδαι, Lagidae; after Ptolemy I's father, Lagus), was a Macedonian Greek royal dynasty which ruled the Ptolemaic Kingdom in Ancient Egypt during the Hellenistic period. Their rule lasted for 275 years, from 305 to 30 BC. The Ptolemaic was the last dynasty of ancient Egypt.

Ptolemy, one of the seven somatophylakes (bodyguard companions), a general and possible half-brother of Alexander the Great, was appointed satrap of Egypt after Alexander's death in 323 BC. In 305 BC, he declared himself Pharaoh Ptolemy I, later known as Sōter "Saviour". The Egyptians soon accepted the Ptolemies as the successors to the pharaohs of independent Egypt. Ptolemy's family ruled Egypt until the Roman conquest of 30 BC.

Like the earlier dynasties of ancient Egypt, the Ptolemaic dynasty practiced inbreeding including sibling marriage, but this did not start in earnest until nearly a century into the dynasty's history. All the male rulers of the dynasty took the name Ptolemy, while queens regnant were all called Cleopatra, Arsinoe or Berenice. The most famous member of the line was the last queen, Cleopatra VII, known for her role in the Roman political battles between Julius Caesar and Pompey, and later between Octavian and Mark Antony. Her apparent suicide at the conquest by Rome marked the end of Ptolemaic rule in Egypt.

Ptolemaic rulers and consorts

The Cup of the Ptolemies: front (top) and back (bottom) of the cup (Cabinet des Médailles)Dates in brackets represent the regnal dates of the Ptolemaic pharaohs. They frequently ruled jointly with their wives, who were often also their sisters, aunts or cousins. Several queens exercised regal authority. Of these, one of the last and most famous was Cleopatra ("Cleopatra VII Philopator", 51–30 BC), with her two brothers and her son serving as successive nominal co-rulers. Several systems exist for numbering the later rulers; the one used here is the one most widely employed by modern scholars.

 Ptolemy I Soter (303–282 BC) married first Thaïs, then Artakama, then Eurydice, and finally Berenice I
 Ptolemy II Philadelphus (285–246 BC) married Arsinoe I, then Arsinoe II; ruled jointly with Ptolemy Epigonos (267–259 BC)
 Ptolemy III Euergetes (246–221 BC) married Berenice II
 Ptolemy IV Philopator (221–203 BC) married Arsinoe III
 Ptolemy V Epiphanes (203–181 BC) married Cleopatra I Syra
 Ptolemy VI Philometor (181–164 BC, 163–145 BC) married Cleopatra II, briefly ruled jointly with Ptolemy Eupator in 152 BC
 Ptolemy VII Neos Philopator (possibly never reigned)
 Ptolemy VIII Physcon (170–163 BC, 145–116 BC) married Cleopatra II, then Cleopatra III; temporarily expelled from Alexandria by Cleopatra II from 131 to 127 BC, then reconciled with her in 124 BC.
 Cleopatra II Philometora Soteira (131–127 BC), in opposition to Ptolemy VIII Physcon
Ptolemy Apion (c.120-96 BC), son of Ptolemy VIII. Last Ptolemaic king of Cyrene. 
 Cleopatra III Philometor Soteira Dikaiosyne Nikephoros (Kokke) (116–101 BC) ruled jointly with Ptolemy IX Lathyros (116–107 BC) and Ptolemy X Alexander I (107–101 BC)
 Ptolemy IX Lathyros (116–107 BC, 88–81 BC as Soter II) married Cleopatra IV, then Cleopatra Selene; ruled jointly with Cleopatra III in his first reign
 Ptolemy X Alexander I (107–88 BC) married Cleopatra Selene, then Berenice III; ruled jointly with Cleopatra III till 101 BC
 Berenice III Philopator (81–80 BC)
 Ptolemy XI Alexander II (80 BC) married and ruled jointly with Berenice III before murdering her; ruled alone for 19 days after that.
 Ptolemy XII Neos Dionysos (Auletes) (80–58 BC, 55–51 BC) married Cleopatra V Tryphaena
 Cleopatra VI Tryphaena (58–57 BC) ruled jointly with Berenice IV Epiphaneia (58–55 BC), possibly identical with Cleopatra V Tryphaena
 Cleopatra ("Cleopatra VII Philopator", 51–30 BC) ruled jointly with Ptolemy XIII Theos Philopator (51–47 BC), Ptolemy XIV (47–44 BC) and Ptolemy XV Caesarion (44–30 BC).
 Arsinoe IV (48–47 BC), in opposition to Cleopatra
 Ptolemy of Mauretania (13 or 9 BC–AD 40) Client king and ruler of Mauretania for Rome

Ptolemaic family tree

Other notable members of the Ptolemaic dynasty

Ptolemy Keraunos (died 279 BC) – eldest son of Ptolemy I Soter. Eventually became king of Macedonia.
Ptolemy Apion (died 96 BC) – son of Ptolemy VIII Physcon. Made king of Cyrenaica. Bequeathed Cyrenaica to Rome.
Ptolemy Philadelphus (born 36 BC) – son of Mark Antony and Cleopatra VII.
Ptolemy of Mauretania (died 40 AD) – son of King Juba II of Numidia and Mauretania and Cleopatra Selene II, daughter of Cleopatra VII and Mark Antony. King of Mauretania.
Ptolemy II of Telmessos, grandson of Ptolemy Epigonos, flourished second half of 3rd century BC and first half of 2nd century BC
Ptolemy of Cyprus, king of Cyprus c. 80–58 BC, younger brother of Ptolemy XII Auletes

Health

Continuing the tradition established by previous Egyptian dynasties, the Ptolemies engaged in inbreeding including sibling marriage, with many of the pharaohs being married to their siblings and often co-ruling with them. Ptolemy I and other early rulers of the dynasty were not married to their relatives, the childless marriage of siblings Ptolemy II and Arsinoe II being an exception. The first child-producing incestuous marriage in the Ptolemaic dynasty was that of Ptolemy IV and Arsinoe III, who were succeeded as co-pharaohs by their son Ptolemy V, born 210 BC. The most well-known Ptolemaic pharaoh, Cleopatra VII, was at different times married to and ruled with two of her brothers (Ptolemy XIII until 47 BC and then Ptolemy XIV until 44 BC), and their parents were likely siblings or possibly cousins as well.

Contemporaries describe a number of the Ptolemaic dynasty members as extremely obese, whilst sculptures and coins reveal prominent eyes and swollen necks. Familial Graves' disease could explain the swollen necks and eye prominence (exophthalmos), although this is unlikely to occur in the presence of morbid obesity. This is all likely due to inbreeding depression. In view of the familial nature of these findings, members of the Ptolemaic dynasty likely suffered from a multi-organ fibrotic condition such as Erdheim–Chester disease or a familial multifocal fibrosclerosis where thyroiditis, obesity and ocular proptosis may have all occurred concurrently.

Gallery of images

See also

 Argead dynasty, another Greek dynasty in Egypt which ruled immediately prior to the Ptolemies
 Donations of Alexandria
 Hellenistic period
 History of ancient Egypt
 List of pharaohs#Ptolemaic Dynasty
 List of Seleucid rulers
 On Weights and Measures, which contains a chronology of the Ptolemies
 Ptolemaic Decrees
 Roman pharaohs

References

Further reading
 A. Lampela, Rome and the Ptolemies of Egypt: The development of their political relations 273–80 B.C. (Helsinki, 1998).
 J. G. Manning, The Last Pharaohs: Egypt Under the Ptolemies, 305–30 BC (Princeton, 2009).
 Susan Stephens, Seeing Double: Intercultural Poetics in Ptolemaic Alexandria (Berkeley, 2002).

External links

Livius.org: "Ptolemies"—by Jona Lendering

 
States and territories established in the 4th century BC
States and territories disestablished in the 1st century BC
Dynasties of ancient Egypt
Hellenistic dynasties
Ptolemaic
African royal families
Ancient Greek dynasties
Ancient royal families
4th century BC in Egypt
3rd century BC in Egypt
2nd century BC in Egypt
1st century BC in Egypt
4th-century BC establishments in Egypt
1st-millennium BC disestablishments in Egypt
305 BC
300s BC establishments
30 BC
4th-century BC establishments in Greece
1st-century BC disestablishments in Greece